This is a list of government ministries that compose the executive branch of the Government of Indonesia. There are currently 34 ministries, which consists of four coordinating ministries and 30 ministries.

Current ministries 
The following is a list of government ministries that currently exist. If a ministry does not have their own seals or logos, it will use the national emblem of Indonesia, the "Garuda Pancasila".

Coordinating ministries

Ministries

See also 

 Cabinet of Indonesia
 Government of Indonesia

References

External links 

Government of Indonesia
Government ministries of Indonesia
Ministries
Lists of government ministries